The 1971 Wightman Cup was the 43rd edition of the annual women's team tennis competition between the United States and Great Britain. It was held at the Cleveland Arena in Cleveland, Ohio in the United States.

References

Wightman Cups by year
Wightman Cup, 1971
Wightman Cup
Wightman Cup
Wightman Cup